Skirts is an Australian television police drama broadcast on the Seven Network in 1990. Skirts was produced by Roger Le Mesurier and Roger Simpson. It was directed by Brendan Maher, Richard Sarell and Ian Gilmour. 40 episodes were produced over 3 seasons in 1990 and the series screened between April and September 1990. The last episode aired was season 2, episode 12. The final 14 episodes were never aired by the Seven Network.

Main cast

Recurring/semi-regular & guest cast

Production 
Production on the pilot episode began in June 1989 in Melbourne, Victoria and it was delivered to the Seven Network by August the same year.

Skirts first aired on Wednesday 18 April 1990 with a pilot feature length episode and the first official episode was broadcast on Sunday 22 April 1990 on Channel 7.

Selected episodes of Skirts were again broadcast in 1993 on the Seven Network in a late night time slot in the hope by producer and creator Roger Simpson that the series might be revised.

Series overview

Episode list

Pilot

Season 1 (1990)

Season 2 (1990) 

 Aired on HSV7 in Victoria Only.

Season 3 (1995) 
Due to low ratings of the previous episodes It is believed that Channel 7 decided not to air any episodes from the 3rd season. However there is nothing to confirm if was or wasn't broadcast.

Home media 
The copyright to Skirts is held by the producer of the show Roger Simpson.

As of 14 February 2023 Skirts Still isn't available on DVD or Any streaming sites.

See also 
 List of Australian television series
 List of Seven Network programs

References

External links
 
 Skirts at the Australian Television Information Archive
 Skirts at the National Film and Sound Archive

1990s Australian drama television series
Seven Network original programming
1990 Australian television series debuts
1990 Australian television series endings
1990s Australian crime television series